Want You Back may refer to:

 "Want You Back" (5 Seconds of Summer song), 2018
 "Want You Back" (Haim song), 2017
 "Want You Back", a 2019 song by Grey featuring Léon
 "Want You Back", a song by Tim McGraw on the 2015 album Damn Country Music

Other uses
 "(Want You) Back in My Life Again", a 1981 song by the Carpenters

See also
 "Want U Back", a 2012 song by Cher Lloyd
 I Want You Back (disambiguation)